This article contains information about the literary events and publications of 1985.

Events
February 25 – Sue Limb's parodic pastiche of the Lake Poets, The Wordsmiths at Gorsemere, begins broadcasting on BBC Radio 4 in the U.K.
March 1 –  The GNU Manifesto by Richard Stallman is published for the first time, and becomes a fundamental philosophical source within the free software movement.
August 11 – A memorial to the poet Hugh MacDiarmid is unveiled near his home at Langholm, Scotland.
unknown dates – Three notable novels in English by female authors are published during the year: Margaret Atwood's The Handmaid's Tale, Jilly Cooper's Riders, the first of the Rutshire Chronicles, and Jeanette Winterson's Oranges Are Not the Only Fruit.

New books

Fiction
Isaac Asimov – Robots and Empire
Margaret Atwood – The Handmaid's Tale
Jean M. Auel – The Mammoth Hunters
Iain Banks – Walking on Glass
Clive Barker – The Damnation Game
Greg Bear
Blood Music
Eon
M. C. Beaton – Death of a Gossip
Thomas Bernhard – Old Masters: a comedy (Alte Meister: Komödie)
Anthony Burgess – The Kingdom of the Wicked
Orson Scott Card – Ender's Game
Jilly Cooper – Rivals
Bernard Cornwell – Sharpe's Honour
Don DeLillo – White Noise
Friedrich Dürrenmatt – The Execution of Justice (Justiz)
Bret Easton Ellis – Less than Zero
Steve Erickson – Days Between Stations
John Fowles – A Maggot
Carlos Fuentes – The Old Gringo (Gringo Viejo)
William Gaddis – Carpenter's Gothic
Gabriel García Márquez – Love in the Time of Cholera (El amor en los tiempos del cólera)
Jane Gardam – Crusoe's Daughter
Alasdair Gray – The Fall of Kelvin Walker: A Fable of the Sixties
Graham Greene – The Tenth Man
Amy Hempel – Reasons to Live 
Frank Herbert – Chapterhouse: Dune
John Irving – The Cider House Rules
Garrison Keillor – Lake Wobegon Days
Stephen King – Skeleton Crew
László Krasznahorkai – Satantango
Derek Lambert – The Man Who Was Saturday
Ursula K. Le Guin – Always Coming Home
Doris Lessing – The Good Terrorist
H. P. Lovecraft
At the Mountains of Madness and Other Novels
The Dunwich Horror and Others (corrected edition)
Richard A. Lupoff – Lovecraft's Book
Cormac McCarthy – Blood Meridian
Larry McMurtry – Lonesome Dove
John D. MacDonald – The Lonely Silver Rain
James A. Michener – Texas
Brian Moore – Black Robe
Bharati Mukherjee – Darkness (short stories)
Iris Murdoch – The Good Apprentice
Orhan Pamuk – The White Castle  (Beyaz Kale)
Ellis Peters – An Excellent Mystery
Caryl Phillips – The Final Passage
Peter Pohl – Johnny, My Friend (Janne, min vän)
Guy Rewenig – Hannert dem Atlantik (first novel in the Luxembourgish language)
Carl Sagan – Contact
Nava Semel – Kova Zekhukhit (Hat of Glass, short stories)
Sidney Sheldon – If Tomorrow Comes
Patrick Süskind – Perfume: The Story of a Murderer
Sue Townsend – Rebuilding Coventry
Anne Tyler – The Accidental Tourist
Andrew Vachss – Flood
Kurt Vonnegut – Galápagos
Jeanette Winterson – Oranges Are Not the Only Fruit
Roger Zelazny – Trumps of Doom

Children and young people
Chester Aaron – Out of Sight, Out of Mind
Pamela Allen – A Lion in the Night
Chris Van Allsburg – The Polar Express
Frank Asch – I Can Blink
Kirsten Boie – Paule ist ein Glücksgriff
Robert Cormier – Beyond the Chocolate War
Roald Dahl – The Giraffe and the Pelly and Me
Virginia Hamilton (with Leo and Diane Dillon) – The People Could Fly: American Black Folktales
Patricia MacLachlan – Sarah, Plain and Tall
Laura Numeroff – If You Give a Mouse a Cookie
Pat O'Shea – The Hounds of the Morrigan
Bill Peet – The Kweeks of Kookatumdee
Cynthia Rylant – A Blue-Eyed Daisy
Jacqueline Wilson – How to Survive Summer Camp (novel)
Elizabeth Winthrop – The Castle in the Attic

Drama
Peter Brook and Jean-Claude Carrière (adapted) – Mahabharata
Christopher Hampton (adapted) – Les Liaisons Dangereuses
David Hare and Howard Brenton – Pravda
Larry Kramer – The Normal Heart
Wallace Shawn – Aunt Dan and Lemon
Sam Shepard – A Lie of the Mind
Neil Simon – Biloxi Blues
August Wilson – Fences

Poetry
Carol Ann Duffy – Standing Female Nude

Non-fiction
Svetlana Alexievich – U voyny — ne zhenskoye litso (War's Unwomanly Face)
Bill Bryson – The Palace under the Alps and Over 200 Other Unusual, Unspoiled and Infrequently Visited Spots in 16 European Countries
Roger Caron – Bingo! The Horrifying Eyewitness Account of a Prison Riot
Allen Carr – The Easy Way to Stop Smoking
Timothy J. Cooney - Telling Right From Wrong
Michael Denton – Evolution: A Theory in Crisis
Elaine Dundy – Elvis and Gladys
Julien Gracq – The Shape of a City
G. L. Harriss (editor) – Henry V: The Practice of Kingship
Ernest Hemingway – The Dangerous Summer 
Pauline Kael – State of the Art
David Lowenthal – The Past Is a Foreign Country
Walter A. McDougall – ...The Heavens and the Earth: A Political History of the Space Age
Tim O'Brien – The Nuclear Age
Priscilla Beaulieu Presley – Elvis and Me
David Robinson – Chaplin: His Life and Art
Oliver Sacks – The Man Who Mistook His Wife for a Hat
Roger Scruton – Thinkers of the New Left
Gary Soto – Living Up the Street
Crawford Young and Thomas Turner - The Rise and Decline of the Zairian State

Births
February 7 - Justina Ireland, American science-fiction and fantasy author of young-adult fiction
April 24 – Alexander Zeldin, British playwright and director
September 24 – Eleanor Catton, New Zealand novelist
September 30 – Téa Obreht, Yugoslav-born American novelist writing in English

Deaths
January 1 – Sigerson Clifford, Irish poet, playwright, and civil servant (born 1913)
January 5 – Alexis Rannit, Estonian-born American poet and critic (born 1914)
February 6 – James Hadley Chase, English thriller novelist (born 1906)
February 19 – Carl Joachim Hambro, Norwegian novelist, essayist and philologist (born 1914)
March 15 – Radha Krishna Choudhary, Indian historian and philosopher (born 1921)
April 4 – Kate Roberts, Welsh writer (born 1891)
April 7 – Carl Schmitt, German political theorist (born 1888)
April 17 – Basil Bunting, English poet (born 1900)
April 25 – Uku Masing, Estonian religious philosopher, linguist and writer (born 1909)
May 12 – Josephine Miles, American poet and literary critic (born 1911)
May 18 – Hedley Bull, Australian economist (cancer, born 1932)
May 25 – Robert Nathan, American novelist and poet (born 1894)
June 8 – Hu Feng (胡风), Chinese novelist (born 1902)
June 16 – Ernst Orvil, Norwegian novelist, poet and playwright (born 1898)
July 16 – Heinrich Böll, German novelist, Nobel laureate (born 1917)
July 29 – Judah Waten, Australian novelist (born 1911)
August 14 – Alfred Hayes, English-born American novelist, poet and screenwriter (born 1911)
August 30 – (Janet) Taylor Caldwell, English-born American novelist (born 1900)
September 1 – Saunders Lewis, Welsh writer and broadcaster (Plaid Cymru) (born 1893)
September 17 – Fran Ross, African American satirist (born 1935)
September 22 – D. J. Opperman, South African Afrikaans poet (born 1914)
October 1 – E. B. White, American children's writer and writer on style (born 1899)
October 11 – Alex La Guma, South African novelist and political activist (born 1925)
October 24 – László Bíró, Hungarian journalist and inventor (born 1899)
October 31 – Nikos Engonopoulos, Greek poet (born 1903)
November 3 – J. M. Wallace-Hadrill, English historian (born 1916)
November 4 – Hilda Vaughan, Welsh novelist and short story writer (born 1892)
November 11 – James Hanley, English-born novelist and dramatist of Irish extraction (born 1897)
November 25
Geoffrey Grigson, English poet and critic (born 1905)
Elsa Morante, Italian novelist (born 1912)
November 27 – Fernand Braudel, French historian (born 1902)
December 2 – Philip Larkin, English poet (born 1922)
December 7 – Robert Graves, English novelist, poet and critic (born 1895)

Awards
Nobel Prize for Literature: Claude Simon

Australia
The Australian/Vogel Literary Award: no award given out this year
C. J. Dennis Prize for Poetry: Kevin Hart, Your Shadow; Rosemary Dobson, The Three Fates
Kenneth Slessor Prize for Poetry, Kevin Hart, Your Shadow
Mary Gilmore Prize: Doris Brett, The Truth about Unicorns
Miles Franklin Award: Christopher Koch, The Doubleman

Canada
See 1985 Governor General's Awards for a complete list of winners and finalists for those awards.

France
Prix Goncourt: Yann Queffélec, Les Noces barbares
Prix Médicis French: Michel Braudeau, Naissance d'une passion
Prix Médicis International: Joseph Heller, God Knows

Spain
Miguel de Cervantes Prize: Gonzalo Torrente Ballester

United Kingdom
Booker Prize: Keri Hulme, The Bone People
Carnegie Medal for children's literature: Kevin Crossley-Holland, Storm
Cholmondeley Award: Dannie Abse, Peter Redgrove, Brian Taylor
Eric Gregory Award: Graham Mort, Adam Thorpe, Pippa Little, James Harpur, Simon North, Julian May
James Tait Black Memorial Prize for fiction: Robert Edric, Winter Garden
James Tait Black Memorial Prize for biography: David Nokes, Jonathan Swift: A Hypocrite Reversed
Newdigate Prize: Robert Twigger
Whitbread Best Book Award: Douglas Dunn, Elegies

United States
Agnes Lynch Starrett Poetry Prize: Liz Rosenberg, The Fire Music
American Academy of Arts and Letters Gold Medal in Poetry, Robert Penn Warren
Frost Medal: Robert Penn Warren
Nebula Award: Orson Scott Card, Ender's Game
Newbery Medal for children's literature: Robin McKinley, The Hero and the Crown
Pulitzer Prize for Drama: James Lapine for book; Stephen Sondheim for music and lyrics, Sunday in the Park With George
Pulitzer Prize for Fiction: Alison Lurie – Foreign Affairs
Pulitzer Prize for Poetry: Carolyn Kizer: Yin
Whiting Awards (inaugural year):
Fiction: Raymond Abbott, Stuart Dybek, Wright Morris (fiction/nonfiction), Howard Norman, James Robison, Austin Wright (fiction/nonfiction)
Poetry: Douglas Crase, Jorie Graham, Linda Gregg, James Schuyler

Elsewhere
Premio Nadal: Pau Faner Coll – Flor de sal

References

 
Years of the 20th century in literature